Modlin may refer to:

 Modlin, Nowy Dwór Mazowiecki County, a village until 1961, now a district of Nowy Dwór Mazowiecki, Poland
 Modlin Army, a Polish army during the invasion of Poland in 1939
 Battle of Modlin, a battle during the Polish September Campaign
 Modlin Fortress, a fortress constructed in the 19th century
 Modlin Airport, an airport serving the Warsaw area
 ORP Wilia or Modlin, a ship of the Polish Merchant Navy during World War II